The Latvian Museum of Photography is a museum in Riga, Latvia devoted to photography. It is a division of the Museum of the History of Riga and Navigation and has been open since 1993.

The museum is situated in a 16th century merchant building. In the exhibition halls there are renovated colorful wall paintings and historic parquet flooring. The building is located near the Riga Film Museum and the Latvian Sport Museum on Alksnaju street in one of the oldest building areas of Riga dated from year 1500.

The author of the permanent exhibition Development of Photography in Latvia. 1839 – 1940 is the historian Peteris Korsaks who has worked for many years in the Museum of the History of Riga and Navigation and the Latvian Museum of Photography. The exhibition is installed on the second floor, and temporary exhibitions are exhibited on the third floor.

Temporary exhibitions of Latvian and foreign photographers, and scientific conferences, are organised. Works from the museum's permanent collection are also exhibited. An authentic painted background used in the photo studio of photographer Martins Luste in Mazsalaca in the beginning of the 20th century can also be viewed. In addition to the permanent and other exhibitions, museum staff offer tours, lectures and consultations.

External links

Photography museums and galleries in Latvia
Museums in Riga
Photographic technology museums
1993 establishments in Latvia